Melosira is a genus of diatoms belonging to the family Melosiraceae.

The genus has cosmopolitan distribution, and inhabits both freshwater and marine habitats.

Species

Species:

Gaillonella ampla 
Gaillonella apiculata 
Gaillonella asperula 
Gaillonella biseriata 
Gaillonella borei 
Gaillonella californica 
Gaillonella calligera 
Gaillonella campylosira 
Gaillonella capsularis 
Gaillonella carinata 
Gaillonella circularis 
Gaillonella coarctata 
Gaillonella comoides 
Gaillonella corneola 
Gaillonella coronata 
Gaillonella crenata 
Gaillonella crotonensis 
Gaillonella cuneata 
Gaillonella curvata 
Gaillonella decussata 
Gaillonella digitus 
Gaillonella discoplea 
Gaillonella distans 
Gaillonella ferruginea 
Gaillonella gallica 
Gaillonella gemmata 
Gaillonella gibba 
Gaillonella glomerata 
Gaillonella halophila 
Gaillonella horologium 
Gaillonella hyperborea 
Gaillonella irregularis 
Gaillonella italica 
Gaillonella laevis 
Gaillonella laminaris 
Gaillonella lineata 
Gaillonella lineolata 
Gaillonella lirata 
Gaillonella marchica 
Gaillonella marylandica 
Gaillonella mesodon 
Gaillonella moniliformis 
Gaillonella nilotica 
Gaillonella novaehollandiae 
Gaillonella nummuloides 
Gaillonella oculus 
Gaillonella operculata 
Gaillonella orichalcea 
Gaillonella patina 
Gaillonella pileata 
Gaillonella plana 
Gaillonella plicata 
Gaillonella procera 
Gaillonella punctata 
Gaillonella punctigera 
Gaillonella scala 
Gaillonella sideropous 
Gaillonella sol 
Gaillonella sphaerophora 
Gaillonella spiralis 
Gaillonella stellata 
Gaillonella subtilis 
Gaillonella sulcata 
Gaillonella taeniata 
Gaillonella tenerrima 
Gaillonella tenuis 
Gaillonella tincta 
Gaillonella tornata 
Gaillonella trachealis 
Gaillonella tympanum 
Gaillonella umbellata 
Gaillonella umbonata 
Gaillonella undata 
Gaillonella undulata 
Gaillonella vaginata 
Gaillonella varians 
Gaillonella vermicularis 
Gaillonella virginica 
Melosira accinctus 
Melosira aculeifera 
Melosira adeliae 
Melosira aequalis 
Melosira africana 
Melosira agassizii 
Melosira agria 
Melosira akkavaarensis 
Melosira albicans 
Melosira alphabetica 
Melosira alternans 
Melosira ambigua 
Melosira americana 
Melosira anastomosans 
Melosira angustissima 
Melosira annularis 
Melosira anormal 
Melosira antarctica 
Melosira architecturalis 
Melosira arctica 
Melosira arcuata 
Melosira arenosa 
Melosira areolata 
Melosira argus 
Melosira arundinacea 
Melosira astridae 
Melosira atlymica 
Melosira aueri 
Melosira bacillosa 
Melosira baicalensis 
Melosira baikalensis 
Melosira bellicosa 
Melosira biharensis 
Melosira biseriata 
Melosira bituminosa 
Melosira biwae 
Melosira bongrainii 
Melosira borreri 
Melosira borrerii 
Melosira bottnica 
Melosira boulayana 
Melosira brandinii 
Melosira bruni 
Melosira caliginosa 
Melosira campaniensis 
Melosira camusi 
Melosira canadensis 
Melosira canalifera 
Melosira caputmedusae 
Melosira carconensis 
Melosira caspica 
Melosira catenata 
Melosira charcotii 
Melosira cincta 
Melosira clavigera 
Melosira clypeus 
Melosira complexa 
Melosira concinna 
Melosira constricta 
Melosira cornuta 
Melosira coronaria 
Melosira coronata 
Melosira costata 
Melosira crassa 
Melosira crenulata 
Melosira cretacea 
Melosira cribrosa 
Melosira cristata 
Melosira crucicula 
Melosira crucipunctata 
Melosira csakyana 
Melosira cucullata 
Melosira curvatula 
Melosira cycola 
Melosira dactylus 
Melosira davidsonii 
Melosira deblockii 
Melosira decipiens 
Melosira decussata 
Melosira dendrophila 
Melosira densserrae 
Melosira dentata 
Melosira denticulata 
Melosira dewildemanii 
Melosira dickiei 
Melosira discigera 
Melosira dispersa 
Melosira dougetii 
Melosira dozyana 
Melosira dubia 
Melosira duplicata 
Melosira dura 
Melosira echinata 
Melosira echinus 
Melosira elegans 
Melosira elongata 
Melosira excentrica 
Melosira excurrens 
Melosira exspectata 
Melosira fausta 
Melosira fennoscandica 
Melosira ferox 
Melosira forolivensis 
Melosira fragilis 
Melosira frigida 
Melosira fungiformis 
Melosira gardneri 
Melosira garganica 
Melosira gelida 
Melosira geometrica 
Melosira gessneri 
Melosira globifera 
Melosira glomus 
Melosira godfroyi 
Melosira goetzeana 
Melosira goretzkyi 
Melosira gothica 
Melosira gowenii 
Melosira grandis 
Melosira granulata 
Melosira granulosa 
Melosira grovei 
Melosira guillauminii 
Melosira haradaae 
Melosira helvetica 
Melosira heribaudii 
Melosira herzogii 
Melosira hetrurica 
Melosira heufleri 
Melosira hibschii 
Melosira hispanica 
Melosira hispida 
Melosira hispida 
Melosira hokkaidoana 
Melosira hormoides 
Melosira hummii 
Melosira hunanica 
Melosira hungarica 
Melosira hustedti 
Melosira hyalina 
Melosira hyalinula 
Melosira hyperborea 
Melosira ignota 
Melosira imperfecta 
Melosira incertum 
Melosira incompta 
Melosira incorrupta 
Melosira indica 
Melosira inflexa 
Melosira inordinata 
Melosira interrupta 
Melosira irregularis 
Melosira irregularis 
Melosira islandica 
Melosira italica 
Melosira japonica 
Melosira jeanbertrandiana 
Melosira jenyssejana 
Melosira jilinensis 
Melosira johnesii 
Melosira juergensis 
Melosira jurgensii 
Melosira jurlijii 
Melosira jutlandica 
Melosira kamtschatica 
Melosira karelica 
Melosira karsteni 
Melosira kochii 
Melosira kondeensis 
Melosira labuensis 
Melosira lacustris 
Melosira laevis 
Melosira laevissima 
Melosira lauterbornii 
Melosira lentigera 
Melosira lineata 
Melosira lirata 
Melosira loczyi 
Melosira lolia 
Melosira lucida 
Melosira lyrata 
Melosira lyrata 
Melosira madagascariensis 
Melosira magnusii 
Melosira major 
Melosira mareei 
Melosira margarita 
Melosira marginata 
Melosira mauryana 
Melosira mbasiensis 
Melosira mediterranea 
Melosira medusa 
Melosira melinitica 
Melosira mexicana 
Melosira micropunctata 
Melosira mikkelsenii 
Melosira minima 
Melosira minuta 
Melosira minutula 
Melosira miocaenica 
Melosira mirabilis 
Melosira moisseevae 
Melosira moniliformis 
Melosira montagnei 
Melosira mucosa 
Melosira muelleri 
Melosira muscigena 
Melosira mutabilis 
Melosira muzzanensis 
Melosira naegeli 
Melosira natans 
Melosira neocaledonica 
Melosira neogena 
Melosira neosphaerica 
Melosira neostriata 
Melosira nivalis 
Melosira nobilis 
Melosira normannii 
Melosira nuda 
Melosira nummuloides 
Melosira nummuloides 
Melosira nummulus 
Melosira numulina 
Melosira nyassensis 
Melosira nygaardii 
Melosira oamaruensis 
Melosira ochracea 
Melosira octogona 
Melosira oculus 
Melosira oculuschamaeleontis 
Melosira oestrupi 
Melosira omma 
Melosira orbifera 
Melosira ordinata 
Melosira orichalcea 
Melosira ornata 
Melosira ostrupi 
Melosira ostrupii 
Melosira papilio 
Melosira papillifera 
Melosira patera 
Melosira paucipunctata 
Melosira pella 
Melosira pensacolae 
Melosira peragalloii 
Melosira perglabra 
Melosira perpusilla 
Melosira pethoei 
Melosira pfaffiana 
Melosira plana 
Melosira polaris 
Melosira ponderosa 
Melosira pontificalis 
Melosira prae-angustissima 
Melosira praeclara 
Melosira praetermissa 
Melosira prichalcea 
Melosira pseudoamericana 
Melosira pseudogranulata 
Melosira pulchella 
Melosira punctata 
Melosira puncticulosa 
Melosira punctissima 
Melosira punctulosa 
Melosira pusilla 
Melosira pyxis 
Melosira radiato-sinuata 
Melosira recedens 
Melosira rieufii 
Melosira robusta 
Melosira roeseana 
Melosira roseana 
Melosira rostratis 
Melosira royatensis 
Melosira salina 
Melosira samoensis 
Melosira saratoviana 
Melosira sarmatica 
Melosira saturnalis 
Melosira scabrosa 
Melosira scalaris 
Melosira schawoi 
Melosira schroederi 
Melosira scopos 
Melosira selecta 
Melosira semilaevis 
Melosira separanda 
Melosira setosa 
Melosira siberica 
Melosira similis 
Melosira simplex 
Melosira sinensis 
Melosira sol 
Melosira solitoria 
Melosira sparsepunctata 
Melosira spec 
Melosira sphaerica 
Melosira spinifera 
Melosira spinosa 
Melosira spinosa 
Melosira spinuligera 
Melosira spinulosa 
Melosira spiralis 
Melosira steffanssoni 
Melosira strangulata 
Melosira striata 
Melosira subflexilia 
Melosira subflexilis 
Melosira subhyalina 
Melosira subornata 
Melosira subsalsa 
Melosira subsetosa 
Melosira subtilis 
Melosira tahitiensis 
Melosira tcherniae 
Melosira tcherniai 
Melosira temperei 
Melosira tenella 
Melosira tenuis 
Melosira tenuissima 
Melosira teres 
Melosira thermalis 
Melosira thompsonii 
Melosira thrypsia 
Melosira thumii 
Melosira timensis 
Melosira transitus 
Melosira transylvanica 
Melosira triannula 
Melosira tricostata 
Melosira trimorpha 
Melosira tropica 
Melosira truncata 
Melosira tuantianensis 
Melosira tuberculosa 
Melosira tubulata 
Melosira turgida 
Melosira undulata 
Melosira vangeliana 
Melosira vanheurckii 
Melosira varennarum 
Melosira variabilis 
Melosira varians 
Melosira variante 
Melosira variata 
Melosira vetustissima 
Melosira vilida

References

Bacillariophyceae
Diatom genera